The Hell Stone is a badly-restored Neolithic dolmen on Portesham Hill in Dorset, England.

Description
The Hell Stone is situated at the head of a dry valley system in the parish of Portesham. The burial chamber is at the southeast end of a rectangular mound.

The chamber was badly restored in 1866 when eight men re-erected the stones, arranging them radially "rather like the slices of a cake" and supporting a large capstone. The chamber may have been, originally, a long rectangular one. A drystone wall runs across the mound, and a pond for watering livestock was dug close to the southeast end of the mound in modern times.

Notes

Dolmens in England
Buildings and structures in Dorset